The 2011 Sun Belt Conference football season was the 11th season of college football play for the Sun Belt Conference. The season began September 1, 2011 and concluded January 8, 2012 as part of the 2011-12 NCAA Division I FBS football season. The 2011 season consisted of nine members: Arkansas State, Florida Atlantic, Florida International, Louisiana–Lafayette, Louisiana–Monroe, Middle Tennessee State, North Texas, Troy  and Western Kentucky.

The 2011 season was last with nine members as South Alabama became the conference's tenth member for the 2012 season.

Preseason

Award watch lists
The following Sun Belt players were named to preseason award watch lists.

Maxwell Award:
 Bobby Rainey – Western Kentucky

Chuck Bednarik Award:
 Jonathan Massaquoi – Troy

John Mackey Award:
 Jack Doyle – Western Kentucky
 Ladarius Green – Louisiana–Lafayette

Fred Biletnikoff Award:
 Dwayne Frampton – Arkansas State
 Ladarius Green – Louisiana–Lafayette

Bronko Nagurski Trophy:
 Jonathan Massaqoui – Troy

Outland Trophy:
 James Brown – Troy

Lombardi Award:
 Demario Davis  – Arkansas State
 Jonathan Massaquoi – Troy

Rimington Trophy:
 Colin Boss – Middle Tennessee
 Tom Castilaw – Arkansas State

Davey O'Brien Award:
 Corey Robinson – Troy

Doak Walker Award:
 Alfred Morris – Florida Atlantic
 Bobby Rainey – Western Kentucky

Walter Camp Award:
 Jonathan Massaquoi – Troy

Lou Groza Award:
 Jake Griffin – Florida International

Sun Belt media days
During the Sun Belt media days on July 18–19 via videoconferencing, Florida International was selected as the favorite to win the conference in the coaches poll. They five first place votes. Troy received two first place votes while Arkansas State and Western Kentucky each received one.

Coaches Poll
 Florida International – 75 (5)
 Troy – 66 (2)
 Middle Tennessee – 54
 Louisiana–Monroe – 22
 Arkansas State – 49 (1)
 North Texas – 33
 Western Kentucky – 28 (1)
 Louisiana–Lafayette – 26
 Florida Atlantic – 20

Preseason All–Conference Team
The conference's head coaches selected their all–conference team during media days.

Offense
QB Corey Robinson–Troy
RB Lance Dunbar–North Texas
RB Bobby Rainey–Western Kentucky
WR Dwayne Frampton–Arkansas State
WR T. Y. Hilton–FIU
WR Luther Ambrose–ULM
TE Ladarius Green–ULL
OL Tom Castilaw–Arkansas State
OL Caylin Hauptmann–FIU
OL Ryan McCaul–ULM
OL Matt Tomlinson–North Texas
OL James Brown–Troy
OL Wes Jeffries–Western Kentucky

Defense
DL Dorvus Woods–Arkansas State
DL Tourek Williams–FIU
DL Ken Dorsey–ULM
DL Jonathan Massaquoi–Troy
LB Demario Davis–Arkansas State
LB Winston Fraser–FIU
LB Xavier Lamb–Troy
DB Kelcie McCray–Arkansas State
DB Jonathan Cyprien–FIU
DB Marcus Bartels–FAU
DB Darius Prelow–ULM

Specialists
PK Alan Gendreau–Middle Tennessee
P Mickey Groody–FAU
KR T.Y. Hilton–FIU

The coaches also selected conference players of the year. T.Y. Hilton of Florida International and Lance Dunbar of North Texas were selected as the preseason co-offensive players of the year and Jonathan Massaquoi of Troy was named the preseason defensive player of the year.

Coaches
NOTE: Stats shown are before the beginning of the season

Sun Belt vs. BCS matchups

Regular season

All dates, times, and TV are tentative and subject to change.

The Sun Belt has teams in 2 different time zones. Times reflect start time in respective time zone of each team (all teams central time except for Florida Atlantic and Florida International which are in eastern time). Conference games start times are that of the home team.

Rankings reflect that of the USA Today Coaches poll for that week until week eight when the BCS poll will be used.

Week One

^ Neutral site

Players of the week:

Week Two

Players of the week:

Week Three

Players of the week:

Week Four

Players of the week:

Arkansas State kicker Brian David was also named one of three Lou Groza Award Stars of the Week and the College Football Performance Awards' National Placekicker of the Week after going making 6 field goals and 5 extra points in the Red Wolves win over Central Arkansas.

Week Five

Players of the week:

Louisiana-Lafayette kicker Brett Baer was also named one of the Lou Groza Award Stars of the Week after making 3 field goals including the game winner as time expired. He also made 4 extra points in the Cajuns win over Florida Atlantic.

Week Six

Players of the week:

Week Seven

Players of the week:

Week Eight

Players of the week:

Week Nine

Players of the week:

Week Ten

Players of the week:

Week Eleven

Players of the week:

Week Twelve

Players of the week:

Week Thirteen

Players of the week:

Bowl Games
The Sun Belt placed 3 teams in bowl games with 4 teams being bowl eligible in 2011. Western Kentucky was the only bowl eligible team not selected.

NOTE: All times are local.

Home attendance

References